Koitabu, or Koita, is a Papuan language of Papua New Guinea in the Port Moresby area.

External links 
 A number of collections at Paradisec include Koita materials

References

Dutton, T.E. "A Koita Grammar Sketch and Vocabulary". In Dutton, T.E. editor, Studies in languages of Central and South-East Papua. C-29:281-412. Pacific Linguistics, The Australian National University, 1975. 

Languages of Papua New Guinea
Koiarian languages
Vulnerable languages